Guided wave testing (GWT) is a non-destructive evaluation method. The method
employs acoustic waves that propagate along an elongated
structure while guided by its boundaries.  This allows the
waves to travel a long distance with little loss in energy. Nowadays, GWT is widely used to inspect and screen many
engineering structures, particularly for the inspection
of metallic pipelines around the world.  In
some cases, hundreds of meters can be inspected from a single
location.  There are also some applications for inspecting
rail tracks, rods and metal plate structures.

Although guided wave testing is also commonly known as guided wave
ultrasonic testing (GWUT) or ultrasonic guided waves (UGWs) or long range ultrasonic testing (LRUT),
it is fundamentally very different from
conventional ultrasonic testing. The frequency used in the inspection depends on the thickness of the structure, but guided wave
testing typically uses ultrasonic frequencies in the range of 10 kHz to several MHz.
Higher frequencies can be used in some cases, but detection range is significantly reduced.  In addition, the underlying physics of guided waves is more
complex than bulk waves. Much of the theoretical background has
been addressed in a separate article.  In this
article, the practical aspect of GWT will be discussed.

History 

The study of guided waves propagating in a structure can be
traced back to as early as the 1920s, mainly inspired by the field
of seismology.  Since then, there has been an increased effort on
the analytical study of guided wave propagation in cylindrical
structures.  It was only in the early 1990s that guided wave testing was
considered as a practical method for the 
non-destructive testing of engineering
structures.  Today, GWT is applied as an integrated health
monitoring program in the oil, gas and chemical industries.

How it works (pipeline inspections) 

Unlike conventional ultrasonics, there are an infinite number of guided wave modes that exist for a pipe geometry, and they can be generally grouped into three families, namely the torsional, longitudinal and flexural modes. The acoustic properties of these wave modes are a function of the pipe geometry, the material and the frequency. Predicting these properties of the wave modes often relies on heavy mathematical modeling which is typically presented in graphical plots called dispersion curves.

In the guided wave testing of pipelines, an array of low frequency transducers is attached around the circumference of the pipe to generate an axially symmetric wave that propagates along the pipe in both the forward and backward directions of the transducer array. The torsional wave mode is most commonly used, although there is limited use of the longitudinal mode. The equipment operates in a pulse-echo configuration where the array of transducers is used for both the excitation and detection of the signals.

At a location where there is a change of cross-section or a change in local stiffness of the pipe, an echo is generated. Based on the
arrival time of the echoes, and the predicted speed of the wave mode at a
particular frequency, the distance of a feature in relation to the
position of the transducer array can be accurately calculated. GWT
uses a system of distance amplitude curves (DAC) to correct for
attenuation and amplitude drops when estimating the cross-section
change (CSC) from a reflection at a certain distance. The DACs are
usually calibrated against a series of echoes with known signal
amplitude such as weld echoes.

Once the DAC levels are set, the signal amplitude correlates well to the CSC of a defect.  GWT does not measure the
remaining wall thickness directly, but it is possible to group the
defect severity in several categories.  One method of doing this is
to exploit the mode conversion phenomenon of the excitation signal
where some energy of the axially symmetric wave mode is converted to
the flexural modes at a pipe feature. The
amount of mode conversion provides an accurate estimate of the
circumferential extent of the defect, and together with the CSC,
operators could establish the severity category.

A typical result of GWT is displayed in an A-scan style with the
reflection amplitude against the distance from the transducer array position.
In the past few years, some advanced systems have started to offer
C-scan type results where the orientation of each feature can
be easily interpreted.  This has shown to be extremely useful when
inspecting large size pipelines.

Guided wave focusing  
As well as incorporating C-scan type results, active focusing capacity can also be achieved by GWT utilising flexural wave modes. This gives two main advantages; firstly the signal to noise ratio (SNR) of a defect echo can be enhanced, secondly it can be used as an additional tool to help discriminate between 'real' and 'false' indications.  However, there are disadvantages associated with this technique; firstly, the defect location must be known before the focusing can be applied, secondly, the separate data set required for the active focusing technique can also significantly reduce the time and cost efficiency of GWT.

Flexural wave modes have sinusoidal variation in their displacement pattern around the circumference, in integer values ranging from 1 to Infinity. Active focusing involves the transmission of multiple flexural wave modes, with time and amplitude corrections applied, in such a way that a circumferential node from each wave mode will arrive at the target position at the same time, the same circumferential position and with the same phase, causing constructive interference. At other circumferential positions the circumferential nodes of the flexural wave modes will arrive out of phase with each other and will interfere destructively. Adjusting the excitation conditions can rotate this focal spot around the pipes circumference. Comparing the response from different circumferential positions can allow the operator to more accurately predict the circumferential position and extent of a defect.

As previously mentioned, the focusing technique can also be used to help discriminate between 'real' and 'false' indications, a 'false' indication being a received signal that does not directly correspond to the position of a defect; such as those from reverberations or from incomplete cancellation of unwanted wave modes. If a 'false' indication is present in the A-scan data, it will also be re-represented in any C-scan type results as this type of processing uses the same original data. As active focusing involves a separate data collection, focusing at the position of a 'false' indication will give a negative result, whereas focusing on a 'true' indication will give a positive result. Therefore, the active focusing technique can help overcome the propensity of 'false calls' generated by guided wave testing systems.

Features

Advantages
Rapid screening for in-service degradation (Long range inspection) – potential to achieve hundreds of meters of inspection range. 
Detection of internal or external metal loss
Reduction in costs of gaining access – insulated line with minimal insulation removal, corrosion under supports without need for lifting, inspection at elevated locations with minimal need for scaffolding, and inspection of road crossings and buried pipes.
Data is fully recorded.
Fully automated data collection protocols.

Disadvantages
Interpretation of data is highly operator dependent. 
Difficult to find small pitting defects. 
Not very effective at inspecting areas close to accessories. 
Can't find gradual wall loss.
Needs good procedure

List of standards 
British Standards (BSI)
 BS 9690-1:2011, Non-destructive testing. Guided wave testing. General guidance and principles
 BS 9690-2:2011, Non-destructive testing. Guided wave testing. Basic requirements for guided wave testing of pipes, pipelines and structural tubulars

ASTM International (ASTM)
 E2775 – 16, Standard Practice for Guided Wave Testing of Above Ground Steel Pipework Using Piezoelectric Effect Transduction
 E2929 – 13, Standard Practice for Guided Wave Testing of Above Ground Steel Piping with Magnetostrictive Transduction

References

 Long Range Guided Wave Inspection Usage – Current Commercial Capabilities and Research Directions

Nondestructive testing